The Antarctic-Phoenix Ridge, also called the Phoenix Ridge, is an extinct mid-ocean ridge that consisted of three spreading ridge segments between the Antarctic Peninsula and the Scotia Sea. It initiated during the Late Cretaceous-Early Tertiary when the Phoenix Plate had divergent boundaries with the Bellingshausen and Pacific plates. Spreading along the Antarctic-Phoenix Ridge had ceased entirely by 3.3 million years ago when the small remnant of the Phoenix Plate was incorporated into the Antarctic Plate.

See also
 List of oceanic ridges

References

Underwater ridges of the Pacific Ocean
Underwater ridges of the Southern Ocean